Moraxella bovoculi is a Gram-negative bacterium in the genus  Moraxella, which was isolated from the eyes of calves in Browns Valley, California. M. bovoculi can cause infectious bovine keratoconjunctivitis.

References

External links
Type strain of Moraxella bovoculi at BacDive -  the Bacterial Diversity Metadatabase
 	

Moraxellaceae
Bacteria described in 2007